Virginia Elizabeth Gardner is an American actress who played Karolina Dean in the Hulu original series Marvel's Runaways (2017–2019), Vicky in David Gordon Green's horror film Halloween (2018) and Shiloh Hunter in Lionsgate's survival film Fall (2022).

Life and career

Gardner was born in Sacramento, California. She attended Sacramento Country Day School from kindergarten to eighth grade. She took part in many of her middle school's productions. Brian Frishman, head of the drama department, directed Gardner from sixth to eighth grade. In 2011, she took online schooling when she moved to Los Angeles, but then chose to take the California High School Proficiency Exam when she was allowed to, in October 2011. Her desire to act was due to the 2001 Sean Penn film I Am Sam; “In the movie, Dakota Fanning’s dad has autism, and I have a brother with autism and I remember watching that as a young girl and relating to her character and being affected by that,” Gardner explains. “That’s what made me want to get into this industry and make things that can affect people and that people can relate to.” She has a black belt in taekwondo, and also took up boxing and nunchucks.

Gardner initially lived with her mother to pursue acting full-time. Gardner lived with her mother for the first year; however, once she started to be more successful and able to handle herself, she moved into her own apartment and began to live on her own. After appearing on the Disney Channel series Lab Rats, she took a year off from acting to work on modeling. When she became absorbed in modeling, she was going to stop acting, but then heard about the audition for Glee. She has modeled for Kohl's, Love Culture, HP, Hollister, LF, and Famous Footwear. In 2015, Gardner starred in the found footage science fiction thriller film Project Almanac as Christina Raskin, the main character's younger sister. The movie helped Gardner to establish herself in Hollywood. In February 2017, it was announced that Gardner would star as Karolina Dean in Marvel's  Runaways (2017), a Hulu original series. She has received wide recognition for her portrayal of the LGBTQ hero. In January 2018, it was announced that Gardner would star as Vicky in the horror film Halloween (2018), a sequel to the 1978 film of the same name.

Personal life
Gardner describes herself as a feminist. She is engaged to Jed Elliott, bassist of The Struts.

Filmography

Film

Television

Awards and nominations

References

External links

Virginia (Ginny) Gardner on Instagram

Living people
21st-century American actresses
Actresses from Los Angeles
Actresses from Sacramento, California
American television actresses
American film actresses
American child actresses
American feminists
Year of birth missing (living people)